Elisabeth "Lisa" Paus (born 19 September 1968) is a German politician who has served as the Federal Minister for Family Affairs, Senior Citizens, Women and Youth since 25 April 2022. A member of Alliance 90/The Greens and an economist by training, she has served as a Member of the German Bundestag for the state of Berlin since 2009.

Early life and education 
Paus was born in Rheine, West Germany, and grew up in nearby Emsbüren, close to the Dutch border. She grew up in an affluent family; her father, the engineer Hermann Paus, founded and owned the Hermann Paus Maschinenfabrik, a company with around 250 employees that produces special-purpose machines and vehicles for the mining industry.

After graduating from high school she volunteered for one year at an orphanage in Hamburg. She then moved to Berlin to study at the Free University. She graduated in 1999 with a master's degree in economics. 

From 1997 until 1999, Paus worked for Frieder Otto Wolf who was a Member of the European Parliament (MEP) for Germany's Green Party. In 2005 she became a teacher at the Berlin School of Economics and Law.

Political career

Career in state politics 
In 1995, Paus joined Germany's Green Party, Alliance 90/The Greens. She was involved in the party in various forms. In the 1999 state election, she was elected to the State Parliament of Berlin (Abgeordnetenhaus). There she was her parliamentary group's spokesperson on economic policy.

Member of the German Parliament, 2009–present 

Paus has been a Member of the German Bundestag since the 2009 federal elections. She has stood in Berlin-Charlottenburg-Wilmersdorf in 2013, 2017 and 2021. She is a member of the Finance Committee and within the committee she is the Green's spokesperson. In her first term between 2009 and 2013, she also served on the Committee on the Affairs of the European Union.

On the Finance Committee, Paus was involved in the parliamentary inquiry into the Wirecard scandal from 2020 until 2021; following the inquiry's completion, she co-authored a 675-page report together with Florian Toncar and Fabio De Masi.

In addition to her committee assignments, Paus has served as deputy chairwoman of the German-Irish Parliamentary Friendship Group (since 2014) and of the  Parliamentary Friendship Group for Relations with Malta and Cyprus (since 2018). She is also a member of the German-Italian Parliamentary Friendship Group and the German-Slovenian Parliamentary Group.

Ahead of the national elections in 2017 and 2021, Paus was elected to lead her party's campaign in the state of Berlin.

In the negotiations to form a so-called traffic light coalition of the Social Democrats (SPD), the Green Party and the FDP following the 2021 federal elections, Paus led her party's delegation in the working group on financial regulation and the national budget; her co-chairs from the other parties were Doris Ahnen and Christian Dürr.

From December 2021 to April 2022, Paus served as one her parliamentary group's deputy chairs, under the leadership of co-chairs Britta Haßelmann and Katharina Dröge, where she oversaw the group's activities on financial policy, economic and social affairs.

Other activities
 German Foundation for Active Citizenship and Volunteering (DSEE), Ex-Officio Member of the Board of Trustees (since 2022)
 Total E-Quality initiative, Member of the Board of Trustees (since 2022)
 Forum Ökologisch-Soziale Marktwirtschaft (FÖS), Member of the Advisory Board
 Association for the Taxation of Financial Transactions and for Citizens' Action (ATTAC), Member

Personal life
In 2009, Paus had her first child. The child's father died of cancer in 2013.

References

External links 

1968 births
Living people
People from Rheine
Members of the Bundestag for Berlin
Members of the Abgeordnetenhaus of Berlin
Female members of the Bundestag
Women federal government ministers of Germany
21st-century German women politicians
Free University of Berlin alumni
Members of the Bundestag 2021–2025
Members of the Bundestag 2017–2021
Members of the Bundestag 2013–2017
Members of the Bundestag 2009–2013
Members of the Bundestag for Alliance 90/The Greens